Dr. Kildare's Victory is a 1942 film directed by W. S. Van Dyke. It stars Lew Ayres and Lionel Barrymore. It is the ninth and last of the MGM Dr. Kildare movie series.

Plot summary

Dr. Kildare (Lew Ayres) is involved in a dispute between two competing hospitals. The trouble begins when an intern rushes a beautiful girl to Kildare's hospital. She has a shard of glass imbedded in her heart.

Cast

 Lew Ayres as Dr. Kildare
 Lionel Barrymore as Dr. Leonard Gillespie
 Ann Ayars as Cynthia Cookie Charles
 Robert Sterling as Dr. Donald Withrop
 Jean Rogers as Ms Annabelle Kirkie
 Alma Kruger as Nurse Molly Byrd  
 Walter Kingsford as Dr. Walter Carew  
 Nell Craig as Nurse Parker  
 Edward Gargan as Orderly Willie Brooks  
 Marie Blake as Sally, Switchboard Operator  
 Frank Orth as Michael 'Mike' Ryan  
 George Reed as Conover (as George H. Reed)  
 Barry Nelson as Samuel Z. Cutter  
 Eddie Acuff as Orderly Clifford Genet  
 Gus Schilling as Orderly Leo Cobb
 Stuart Crawford as Arnold Spencer
 William Bakewell as Mr. Hubble
 Charlotte Wynters as Mrs. Hubble
 Ray Walker as Taxi Driver with Injured Man (uncredited)

Production
A follow-up film titled Born to be Bad was planned, but after Ayres requested conscientious objector status, he was let go and the Dr. Kildare series came to an end, to be replaced with a series of films centered on Dr. Gillespie.

References

External links
 
 
 
 

1942 films
1942 crime drama films
American black-and-white films
American crime drama films
Films directed by W. S. Van Dyke
Films scored by Lennie Hayton
Films set in New York City
Films set in hospitals
Metro-Goldwyn-Mayer films
1940s American films
1940s English-language films